Avirostrum is a genus of moths of the family Noctuidae.

Species

 Avirostrum grisea
 Avirostrum lignaria
 Avirostrum ochraceum
 Avirostrum pallens
 Avirostrum pratti Bethune-Baker, 1908

References
 Avirostrum at Markku Savela's Lepidoptera and Some Other Life Forms
 Natural History Museum Lepidoptera genus database

Hypeninae
Moth genera